Heinrich Troeger (4 March 1901, in Zeitz – 28 August 1975, in Bad Nauheim) was a German jurist and politician (SPD).

Life and career 
Troeger was born the son of a medical officer of health (Kreismedizinalrat). After obtaining his Abitur, he studied law and political science at Breslau, Würzburg and Halle and earned a doctoral degree in law in 1922. In 1925 he was a government assessor at the district administration offices in Euskirchen and Dortmund.

A member of the SPD since 1922, Troeger was in 1926 elected mayor of Neusalz and also served from 1929 to 1933 as a member of the Lower Silesia County Council and the local Provincial Committee. After the Nazi seizure of power in 1933, he was relieved of his political offices and from 1934 to 1945 he worked as a lawyer specializing in foreign exchange and tax law in Berlin, ending with the title of officer of administrative law (Verwaltungsrechtsrat).

After World War II, Troeger briefly served as mayor of Jena (1945–1946). Shortly afterwards he moved to West Germany and settled in Hesse. In 1947 he was appointed Assistant Secretary in the Ministry of Finance of Hesse, and served from 1947 until 1949 as Secretary-General of the Council of the Bizone. In 1950-51 he served as Assistant Secretary in the Ministry of Finance for North Rhine-Westphalia under deputy minister Heinrich Weitz and was also a member of various supervisory boards.

From 10 January 1951 until 26 September 1956, Troeger served as Minister of Finance for the state of Hesse under premier Georg August Zinn. He was elected to the Hesse parliament in 1954 and retained his position until his resignation on 3 February 1958.

In 1956–57 Troeger was president of the Hesse Central Bank and in 1958–1969 was Vice President of the Deutsche Bundesbank. During this time, he initiated an eponymous commission on the Reform of the Financial Condition.

Honours 
 1966 - Grand Cross with Star and Sash of the Order of Merit of the Federal Republic of Germany

Mayors of Jena
1901 births
1975 deaths
Social Democratic Party of Germany politicians
Grand Crosses with Star and Sash of the Order of Merit of the Federal Republic of Germany
Members of the Landtag of Hesse
Politicians from the Province of Silesia